The Alberton Football Netball League was an Australian rules football league covering the South Gippsland region of Victoria, Australia.

History

1946: Reformation of Alberton Football Association (League)
The Alberton Football Association was reformed in 1946 after the end of World War II in 1945, renamed the Alberton Football League in 1947, with eight teams comprising the league such as Carrajung, Devon (formed 1883 also known from 1900-1909 as  

West Alberton), Foster (formed 1890), Ramblers, Toora (formed 1891), Welshpool, Woodside and Yarram (formed 1887). The name of the league is taken from the small town of Alberton, near Yarram.

The Ramblers Football Club, after a promising inaugural season in the league where it recorded six wins to just miss the finals, decided to disband from the league and Won Wron Football Club were accepted into the league for the 1949 season.
Four years later, the Carrajung Football Club followed suit which enabled Fish Creek to join the Alberton League in 1953. Carrajung produced many substandard efforts during their seven years of existence in the Alberton League and many matches would result in percentage gaining contests for opposing teams. The club finished last in 1947, 1948, 1950, 1951 and 1952. The very last game Carrajung played in the Alberton League during the 1952 season resulted in Toora forward, Frank Salmon, kicking a record 34 goals 17 behinds out of the teams 35.18 score. Salmon's (and his teammates’ efforts) helped him claim the League goalkicking award by overtaking Woodside great Charles Williamson.

1947–1952: Early dominance by Woodside
Woodside dominated the competition during the early stages as the club won six consecutive premierships from 1947 to 1952. It is the only club to have achieved such a feat in the league's history.

1953–1967: Golden era of Fish Creek success
Fish Creek produced the most outstanding era of success in the Alberton League as it claimed 11 premierships from 15 successive Grand Final appearances between 1953 and 1967. The recruitment of former VFL Collingwood player, Maurice 'Mocca' Dunstan helped the club attain a standard of professionalism that was second to none for a sustained period.

Much focus throughout the late 1950s and 1960s centred around the future of football in the region, with many suggesting that the South Gippsland Football League and the Alberton Football League merge to generate a more powerful football league across South Gippsland for better growth in the sport. However, the AFL continued to function through many debates and became progressively stronger by the 1970s.

1970s: Meeniyan-Dumbalk United and Stony Creek join the fray
In 1969, the Meeniyan-Dumbalk United and Stony Creek Football Clubs joined the Alberton League after the SGFL eventually disbanded as Welshpool won a treble of premierships from 1969 to 1971. Welshpool also became the first club in the AFL to produce an undefeated season with its flag in 1970.

In 1973, Toora and Meeniyan-Dumbalk United fought out a close grand final with Toora winning by a single point. It remains to this day Toora's only Alberton senior grade premiership and the only 1-point grand final (seniors) in the Alberton league's history.

By the late 1970s, Yarram were looking to join the Latrobe Valley Football League but remained with the AFL and by the end of the 1981 season the league was reduced to nine clubs when Won Wron and Woodside merged to form the Won Wron-Woodside Football Club.

The inclusion of Tarwin in 1988 returned the number of clubs to ten but by 1995, Welshpool had amalgamated with Devon.

1996–2005: League Expansion
In 1996, Dalyston, Wonthaggi Rovers, Inverloch, Korumburra and Bena joined the Alberton Football League, after the Bass Valley Wonthaggi FL had been disbanded as part of a restructuring of local football by the Victorian Country Football League. The "final five" system was first utilised with the inclusion of the new clubs.

Devon-Welshpool and Won Wron-Woodside created the Allies when they merged in 1997 and then Bena and Korumburra joined forces to become Korumburra-Bena in 2001.

In 2005 the Phillip Island and Kilcunda-Bass football clubs moved from the defunct West Gippsland Football League to the Alberton Football League.

The 2008 season saw a large contingent from the Devon-Welshpool-Won Wron-Woodside Football Club leave to create a new club, the Woodside & District Wildcats, in the North Gippsland Football League.

2005–2008: DWWWW Allies de-merger

Since merging in 1997 the DWWWW Allies had enjoyed some early years of success with premierships in 1998, 1999 and 2003. However, with the further expansion of the league in 2005 the club tired of travelling up to two hours west to places such as Dalyston, Bass and Cowes. Some supporters and players with the club began agitating for a move to the closer North Gippsland Football League.
This change was looking set to be approved, until in 2007 a proposal was put forth for the club to play all their home games at Woodside. The Devon-Welshpool people of the club who were proud of the facilities at the Alberton West Recreation Reserve, refused to agree.
After a number of meetings failed to find a solution an extraordinary resolution took place. The club de-merged.

Most of the Won Wron-Woodside people, led by Anthony Banik, moved away from the rest of the club to form a new entity known as the Woodside & District Wildcats. The new club would join the North Gippsland Football League from the 2008 season onwards, whilst DWWWW would continue competing in the Alberton league, albeit with a heavily weakened playing list.

The division of the club extended beyond football, causing a major rift within the local community that in some cases continues to this day. Despite, the divide DWWWW refused to revert to their former name of Devon-Welshpool. A number of Won Wron-Woodside life members had remained on board with DWWWW through the split and the club president Matthew Moore had remained hopeful that some Won Wron-Woodside people may return.

In the six years after the de-merger the DWWWW football club's on-field success with virtually non-existent. From 2008 to 2013 the DWWWW senior would achieve only 3 wins and a staggering 105 losses, which included four winless seasons. This level of poor on-field results was mirrored in the reserve and junior grades.

In 2014 after multiple years of struggling for success and maintaining a large enough playing list the options had become limited and the members voted for the club to enter recess.

2005–2009: Formation and departure of Wonthaggi Power
At the end of 2004 the Wonthaggi Rovers (Alberton) and Wonthaggi Blues (West Gippsland Latrobe) would merge to become a new entity known as the Wonthaggi Power. This new club applied to enter the Alberton league, citing junior players resenting travelling to distant clubs such as Sale and Maffra.

This move was met with discontent from some existing Alberton clubs. Wonthaggi with a local population of 7000 people now had a single club to compete against towns with local populations of only approximately 200 people.
Wonthaggi Power were admitted into the Alberton Football League under the provision that if they were proven too strong they would relocate to the much stronger West Gippsland Latrobe Football League.

Wonthaggi Power achieved immediate success making the grand final in their first three years, winning two of them. The reserves and junior teams achieved similar success.
Despite this evidence, Wonthaggi members and administrators refused to relocate to the stronger competition. The club's rivals became increasingly disgruntled and began to seek assistance from the Victorian Country Football League. The governing body reviewed the situation and ordered Wonthaggi Power to begin competing against towns of similar size. In response Wonthaggi Power decided to launch legal action.

Early in 2008 an agreement was reached that would see Wonthaggi compete in Alberton for seasons 2008 and 2009, before departing the league at the conclusion of the 2009 season. This was a legally binding agreement, however the Alberton clubs were still seeking a more rapid solution. They discussed options of forming their own breakaway league or boycotting matches against Wonthaggi Power.

Yarram Football Club were the first club to lead a boycott. They had defeated Wonthaggi Power in the 2007 grand final the previous year and were only scheduled to play Wonthaggi Power once during the 2008 home & away season. The Yarram committee had decided to take matters into their own hands and on 17 May 2008 in a watershed moment for the league they forfeited all grades of football and netball from their round 6 clash against Wonthaggi Power. As a consequence of the forfeiture the Victorian Country Football League issued Yarram with a $6,500 fine - half of which was suspended. Other clubs would avoid following Yarram's example and would instead assist to help cover the costs of their fine.

Wonthaggi would go on to finish the season undefeated and comfortably secure first position on the ladder, whilst Yarram would finish just below them in second position.
Both teams would finally meet for the first time that year in a semi-final clash at Tarwin Lower. In this match, Wonthaggi would defeat Yarram by a massive 64-points in what was fierce and fiery encounter for both players and spectators. They would proceed directly through to the grand final two weeks later were their opponent would again be Yarram. Wonthaggi would become victorious, this time defeating Yarram by 57-points to claim their third flag in the Alberton league.

The dispute would continue into the following season with the VCFL making the recommendation that Wonthaggi Power enter either  Mornington Peninsula Nepean Football League (Casey Cardinia division) or the West Gippsland Latrobe Football League. On July 14, 2009, Wonthaggi Power published an open letter to the VCFL disputing the decision. The letter referred to the decision as 'lacking clarity, direction and vision', whilst labelling the VCFL themselves as 'incompetent'. 
The VCFL did not publicly respond to the letter and despite Wonthaggi Power's resistance it was ultimately decided that the 2009 season would be Wonthaggi's last in Alberton.

Wonthaggi Power would once again finish on top of the ladder with only two losses during the 2009 home & away season.
A victory in the finals would see Wonthaggi progress directly to the grand final and regardless of the result this was to be Wonthaggi's final match in Alberton. Their opponent was third placed Stony Creek, who also happened to be one of the teams to claim a victory against Wonthaggi during the season. 
With such a vast difference in township populations the match was widely considered a 'David verses Goliath' match-up. Despite playing two more finals matches on their way to the grand final Stony Creek would defeat Wonthaggi by 14-points. This was Stony Creek's second Alberton premiership, their first since 1983.

At the conclusion of the season Wonthaggi Power transferred into the newly renamed Gippsland Football League for the start of the 2010 season. For the five years that Wonthaggi Power had participated in the Alberton football league they had made the grand final every season, which included winning three of them.

2010–2020: League Demise
The last round of the 2010 season saw Yarram defeat Tarwin. However, this result was subsequently reversed and the win awarded to Tarwin by the Victorian Country Football League (VCFL) after it was discovered that Yarram had fielded an unregistered player under another identity. Yarram club president, Paul Clavorino, claimed that the player didn't have any impact on the result. The result didn't have any affect for Yarram's finals aspirations as by this point in the season the club was already out of contention. The change in result would impact which teams would play each other in the first week of finals. As a consequence three clubs (Fish Creek, Korumburra-Bena & Tarwin) would end up changing opponents.

Yarram depart to North Gippsland football league
In August 2013, Yarram applied to transfer to the North Gippsland Football League (NGFL). Their application would stall with an unofficial vote from the NGFL clubs to accept Yarram resulting in a fifty-fifty split. Some concerns cited by the NGFL clubs were the reintroduction of a bye, subsequent return to a 20-round season and struggle between clubs for junior footballers.
In October Yarram appealed to AFL Victoria Country who after considering submissions from the relevant parties overturned the initial decision and allowed Yarram to enter the NGFL beginning with 2014 season.
This move ended a 67-year affiliation with the Alberton Football League of which Yarram was a founding member.

Devon-Welshpool-Won Wron-Woodside Recess
In its existence the Devon-Welshpool-Won Wron-Woodside football has twice gone into recess. As of 2020 the club is still in recess.

First recess: 2014 season
On March 30, 2014, after many years of struggling since the 2008 de-merger, members of the DWWWW football club met to vote on the fate of the club.
A shortage of players had already forced the club's committee to give up on fielding a team for the 2014 season. Now the members were voting on whether the club would be placed into a temporary recess or wound up. The club would remain alive after a vote saw close to 100% of members vote for the club to enter a recess.
With the club in recess for the 2014 season the remaining DWWWW players transferred to the neighbouring Yarram and Woodside & District football clubs, who with the influx of players became markedly stronger.
Despite not fielding a team the DWWWW community continued to keep the club's members together with regular meal nights for everyone to get together and continue to support the club. The recess would only last for the one season with the club back fielding a team the following season in 2015.

Second recess: 2018 season — Present
With the recruitment of players from outside of the local area the club was able to field football teams for the 2015, 2016 and 2017 season. During this time the club also experienced some success, coming within 11 points of a place in the 2017 grand final. Unfortunately, an acrimonious saga regarding player payment destabilised the playing group, culminating in several player players walking out on the club.

For the second time in four years the shortage of players forced the club to move into recess for the 2018 season, leaving the Alberton football league with only six clubs fielding teams. The Allies remain in recess to this day.
Since 2017, the club has the maintained a healthy financial position and continues to engage with its members through the likes of midweek meals and social functions.

While the DWWWW remains still remains alive, the disbandment of the Alberton football league in 2020 has meant that the club is without a league to participate in. Should the club accumulate enough players to field a team again they would need to seek approval to join either the North Gippsland or Mid Gippsland football league where they could complete.
However, many football followers in the Yarram region believe that the community of 2,200 people is simply too small to sustainably support three football clubs and that with each passing season the likelihood of DWWWW returning a team to the field continues to diminish.

AFL Gippsland Review
A 2015 review, conducted by AFL Gippsland to address issues of competitive imbalance and club sustainability, brought major change to structure of the Alberton Football Netball League. In 2017, the Alberton League was reduced to seven clubs after the departure Dalyston, Korumburra-Bena, Inverloch-Kongwak, Kilcunda-Bass and Phillip Island to the newly formed West Gippsland Football Netball League as part of the review. Prior to the 2018 season, DWWWW went into recess again due to lack of players in the district and would remain in recess throughout the 2019 season.

Colgan Bauer Review
In 2019 AFL Victoria commissioned consultancy group Colgan Bauer to review the structure and sustainability of football in the Gippsland region and provide a strategic plan for the future. A number of town hall style meetings were conducted to gather feedback from community members within the region. A number of ideas were proposed for how to preserve the Alberton Football League. These included adding two clubs from the nearby West Gippsland Football League and the Alberton Football League joining the West Gippsland Football League as a second division.

A further review recommended that the AFL merge with the Mid Gippsland Football League for the 2019 season. However a backlash by some clubs who had concerns over a 15 team competition and increased travel distance of the proposed league.

Final Alberton Match
The final match in the Alberton Football League was the 2019 Grand Final which took place on 31 August 2019. The match was contested by the Foster and Stony Creek football clubs at the Tarwin Lower recreation reserve. Foster defeated Stony Creek by 7 points in what would be the closest grand final margin since 1995. On the date of the match occurring the future of the Alberton had not yet been determined and no one was aware that this was Alberton's final match.

2020 Season Cancellation
The COVID-19 pandemic lead to the 2020 season being abandoned, despite efforts to run a junior competition in conjunction with the Mid Gippsland Football League. Whilst the league sat idle, the planning for the future of the Alberton football clubs continued. On 24 April 2020 a meeting of the Mid Gippsland football clubs saw them vote to accept all six Alberton clubs as of the 2021 season, whilst the Alberton Football League would cease to exist. This decision was met with widespread relief after many years of uncertainty surrounding the future of the league's clubs.
On 25 November 2020 the Alberton Football League conducted its final annual general meeting. A special resolution to dissolve the league was passed and after 74 years of competition the league had officially met its end.

Clubs

Current Clubs

Former clubs

Timeline of clubs

 = indicates premiership year

Players

VFL/AFL Players
During its history the Alberton Football League has produced a number of players who would go on to play in the VFL/AFL competition.

Jarryd Blair
Jarryd Blair played junior football at Wonthaggi Power and in 2006 he was a part of the senior premiership team.  He was selected as pick 27 in the 2009 AFL rookie draft and made his AFL debut in round 14, 2010 against West Coast at Etihad Stadium. His debut AFL season saw him play in Collingwood's 2010 premiership team. Blair played 157 games for Collingwood before being delisted in 2018. In 2020, Wonthaggi Power announced that Blair had been appointed as senior coach for the 2021 season in the Gippsland League.

Brent Macaffer
Brent Macaffer was selected as pick 26 in the 2007 AFL rookie draft. He would play in Collingwood's 2010 premiership team. In 2016, Macaffer announced his retirement from AFL football. Macaffer would return to his original club, Kilcunda Bass to coach the club for the 2017 season. On 13 February 2019, Macaffer was awarded a life member of the Collingwood Football Club.

Nathan  Vardy
Nathan Vardy played his junior football for DWWWW. He was selected at pick 42 by Geelong in the 2009 national draft. At the conclusion of the 2016 season Vardy was traded to the West Coast Eagles. In 2017, with Nic Naitanui and Scott Lycett injured, Vardy had to take charge as West Coast's number one ruckman and played almost every game.  He played a critical role in West Coast's 2018 premiership team. Vardy is one of four current former Alberton players listed by AFL clubs.

Awards
The following major individual awards and accolades are presented each season:
Peter Moore Medal — to the fairest and best player in the league, voted by the umpires
Leading goal kicker award — for the player who scores the most goals during the home & away season
Bill Pollock Medal — the best player on the ground in the grand final
Rising star award — a monthly award for promising up-and-coming players
Team of the year — a squad of 21 players deemed the best in their positions
Most disciplined club award — for the club who receives the most discipline points, voted by the umpires

Season structure

Pre-season
The Alberton Football League like most country leagues does not have a formal Pre-season competition.
As part of their Pre-season preparation clubs will often schedule between one and two practice matches with clubs from other leagues prior to the season beginning. These matches could take on different structures and were primarily conducted on a non-official basis with limited match officials and scores not being recorded.

Premiership season
The Alberton home-and-away season at present lasts for 15 rounds, starting in mid April and ending in early August. As of the 2017 season, each team plays 15 matches. Teams receive four premiership points for a win and two premiership points for a draw. Ladder finishing positions are based on the number of premiership points won, and "percentage" (calculated as the ratio of points scored to points conceded throughout the season) is used as a tie-breaker when teams finish with equal premiership points.

Finals series
Since its inception until 1995 the Alberton finals consisted of a 'final-four' system.
With the inclusion of a number of clubs from the defunct Bass Valley Wonthaggi football league in 1996 the finals series was expanded to a 'final-five' system.
The finals series was expanded again in 2005 with the inclusion of Kilcunda Bass and Phillip Island to become a 'final-six' system.
Since 2017 the finals series has since returned to a 'final-four' system, after a number of clubs left resulting in a smaller competition.

The top four teams at the end of the Alberton home & away season compete in a four-week finals series throughout August, culminating in a grand final to determine the premiers. The grand final is played on the afternoon of the last Saturday in August.

The winning team receives a silver premiership cup and a premiership flag – a new one of each is manufactured each year. The flag has been presented since the league began and is traditionally unfurled at the team's first home game of the following season. Additionally, each player in the grand final-winning team receives a premiership medallion.

2019 Finals series

Grand final venues
For most of its history the Alberton football league grand final was hosted at the Yarram recreation reserve. With the expansion of the league in 1996 the grand final was relocated to the Foster Showgrounds to maintain a central location with respect to the rest of the league.
With Foster football club making the grand final in 2010 and 2011 the grand final was subsequently relocated to Inverloch recreation reserve to avoid a home-ground advantage. The grand final venue would then cycle back to Foster in 2012. The grand final since cycled between a few diffent venues until Tarwin Lower recreation reserve hosted the last Alberton grand final in 2019.

Yarram Recreation Reserve (1946-1952)
Welshpool Recreation Reserve (1953)
Yarram Recreation Reserve (1954-1973)
Foster Showgrounds (1974)
Yarram Recreation Reserve (1975)
Foster Showgrounds (1976-1977)
Yarram Recreation Reserve (1978-1995)
Foster Showgrounds (1996-2009)
Inverloch Recreation Reserve (2010-2011)
Foster Showgrounds (2012)
Wonthaggi Recreation Reserve (2013)
Meeniyan Recreation Reserve (2014-2018)
Tarwin Lower Recreation Reserve (2019)

Finals history

Peter Moore Medallists (Best and fairest winners)

Century Goal Kickers

Final standings

2004 Ladder
   
   
FINALS

2007 Ladder
   
   
FINALS

2008 Ladder
    
   
FINALS

2009 Ladder

    
   
FINALS

2010 Ladder
    

FINALS

2011 Ladder

    
FINALS

2012 Ladder
																		
																		
FINALS

2013 Ladder
																		
																		
FINALS

2014 Ladder

2015 Ladder

2016 Ladder

2017 Ladder

																		
FINALS

2018 Ladder

																		
FINALS

2019 Ladder

																		
FINALS

References

External links
 Official Alberton Football League Website
  Full Points Footy – Alberton Football League

Defunct Australian rules football competitions in Victoria (Australia)
Netball leagues in Victoria (Australia)